Friedrich Adolph Haage (24 March 1796 in Erfurt – 20 September 1866 in Erfurt) was a German gardener and botanist.

Life and work
Haage was the son of Johann Nikolaus Haage and Catharina Barbara Nehrlich. He learned gardening from Johann Heinrich Seidel (1744–1815), the gardener of Frederick Augustus II of Saxony. After finishing his hiking years, he returned to Erfurt. Here he acquired a small plot of land and founded a nursery in 1822. The first seed catalog of his nursery was made in 1824. It is now lost.

Haage had one of the largest collections of cacti at his time.

He was co-founder of the Erfurter Gartenbauvereins (Erfurt Horticultural Association) and later became its director. Erfurt erected a monument of him.

References
 Haage, Friedrich Adolph

1796 births
1866 deaths
Scientists from Erfurt
19th-century German botanists
Botanists with author abbreviations